Manqoba Kunene (born 22 October 1982) is a Swazi professional footballer who plays as a midfielder. As of February 2010, he plays for Mbabane Swallows in the Swazi Premier League and has won 11 caps for his country.

External links

1982 births
Living people
Swazi footballers
Eswatini international footballers
Mbabane Swallows players

Association footballers not categorized by position